Seamus Malin (born September 3, 1940 in Dublin, Ireland) is an Irish former journalist for ESPN. Malin most often commentated on soccer events, such as the UEFA Champions League and World Cup.

He also worked with the NASL's Boston Minutemen and New York Cosmos. He also called World Cup matches for NBC, ABC, and Turner Network Television, plus matches on CBS when the network had NASL rights.

In 2005, he was inducted into the National Soccer Hall of Fame as a media representative.

Malin is a graduate of Harvard University. At one time, he served in the school's admissions department.

References

1940 births
Living people
Irish association football commentators
Harvard University alumni
Association footballers from County Dublin
Harvard Crimson men's soccer players
North American Soccer League (1968–1984) commentators
Olympic Games broadcasters
Major Indoor Soccer League (1978–1992) commentators
Women's United Soccer Association commentators
Association footballers not categorized by position
Irish expatriates in the United States
Association football players not categorized by nationality